Alexander Workman (May 28, 1798 – December 12, 1891) was an Anglo-Irish-Canadian politician and the mayor of Ottawa from 1860 to 1862.

Workman was born in Lisburn, County Antrim, Ireland. He settled in Huntley Township in Upper Canada in 1820. In 1823, he joined his brother in Montreal, where he helped operate an academy, before moving to Bytown in 1845 and establishing a hardware business there with a fellow Unitarian Edward Griffin. He became influential in attempts to organise a Unitarian Church in Ottawa but was ultimately unsuccessful. He was a city council member for many years, finally becoming mayor in 1860 and 1861. His wife, Mary Abbot, died on April 23, 1874, at the age of 72. She is buried in Beechwood Cemetery. Mr. Workman died at the age of 93.

References

Ottawa Times and Ottawa Free Press archives (record of the death of Mary Abbot)
First Unitarian Congregation of Ottawa webpage
Canada Notes (dates)

External links 
 A Canadian Unitarian Almanac and Liturgical Calendar

1798 births
1891 deaths
Canadian Unitarians
Irish Unitarians
Mayors of Ottawa
Politicians from County Antrim
Workman, A
Immigrants to Upper Canada